Impossible Is Not French (French: Impossible... pas français) is a 1974 French comedy film directed by Robert Lamoureux and starring Jean Lefebvre, Pierre Mondy and Pierre Tornade.

Cast
 Jean Lefebvre as Louis Brisset 
 Pierre Mondy as Antoine Brisset 
 Pierre Tornade as Albert Lombard 
 France Dougnac as Catherine Brisset 
 Robert Lamoureux as The Gardener 
 Michel Creton as Francky 
 Hubert Godon as Bernard 
 Jacques Marin as Dussautoy 
 Claire Maurier as Mauricette Brisset 
 Jean-Paul Moulinot as De Sica 
 Louison Roblin as Madeleine 
 Gabriele Tinti as Count Jean-Charles de Bonfort 
 Magali Vendeuil as Francine Brisset 
 Yves Vincent as Nadar 
 Marthe Villalonga as La gardienne d'immeuble

References

Bibliography 
 Rège, Philippe. Encyclopedia of French Film Directors, Volume 1. Scarecrow Press, 2009.

External links 
 

1974 films
1974 comedy films
French comedy films
1970s French-language films
Films directed by Robert Lamoureux
1970s French films